The 2018 AFC U-16 Championship was the 18th edition of the AFC U-16 Championship, the biennial international youth football championship organised by the Asian Football Confederation (AFC) for the men's under-16 national teams of Asia. It took place in Malaysia, which was appointed as hosts by the AFC on 25 July 2017, between 20 September and 7 October 2018. A total of 16 teams played in the tournament.

The top four teams of the tournament qualified for the 2019 FIFA U-17 World Cup in Brazil as the AFC representatives. Japan won their third title, and qualified together with runners-up Tajikistan and semi-finalists Australia and South Korea. Iraq were the defending champions but were eliminated in the group stage.

Qualification

Qualifying was played on 16–29 September 2017. Malaysia also participated in the qualifiers, even though they had already qualified automatically as hosts.

Qualified teams
The following 16 teams qualified for the final tournament.

Venues
The matches were played in three venues around Klang Valley. The venues were Bukit Jalil National Stadium, UM Arena Stadium and Petaling Jaya Stadium. The final match was held at Bukit Jalil National Stadium.

Draw
The draw of the final tournament was held on 26 April 2018, 15:00  MYT (UTC+8), at the AFC House in Kuala Lumpur. The 16 teams were drawn into four groups of four teams. The teams were seeded according to their performance in the 2016 AFC U-16 Championship final tournament and qualification, with the hosts Malaysia automatically seeded and assigned to Position A1 in the draw.

Squads

Players born on or after 1 January 2002 were eligible to compete in the tournament. Each team should register a squad of minimum 18 players and maximum 23 players, minimum three of whom must be goalkeepers.

Group stage
The top two teams of each group advanced to the quarter-finals.

Tiebreakers
Teams were ranked according to points (3 points for a win, 1 point for a draw, 0 points for a loss), and if tied on points, the following tiebreaking criteria were applied, in the order given, to determine the rankings:
Points in head-to-head matches among tied teams;
Goal difference in head-to-head matches among tied teams;
Goals scored in head-to-head matches among tied teams;
If more than two teams are tied, and after applying all head-to-head criteria above, a subset of teams are still tied, all head-to-head criteria above are reapplied exclusively to this subset of teams;
Goal difference in all group matches;
Goals scored in all group matches;
Penalty shoot-out if only two teams are tied and they met in the last round of the group;
Disciplinary points (yellow card = 1 point, red card as a result of two yellow cards = 3 points, direct red card = 3 points, yellow card followed by direct red card = 4 points);
Drawing of lots.

All times are local, MYT (UTC+8).

Group A

Group B

Group C

Group D

Knockout stage
In the knockout stage, penalty shoot-out without extra time was used to decide the winners if necessary.

Bracket

Quarter-finals
The winners qualified for the 2019 FIFA U-17 World Cup.

Semi-finals

Final

Winners

Awards
The following awards were given at the conclusion of the tournament:

Goalscorers

Tournament ranking

Qualified teams for FIFA U-17 World Cup
The following four teams from AFC qualified for the 2019 FIFA U-17 World Cup.

1 Bold indicates champions for that year. Italic indicates hosts for that year.
2 Australia qualified as a member of the OFC for ten tournaments between 1985 and 2005.

Notes

References

External links
, the-AFC.com
AFC U-16 Championship 2018, stats.the-AFC.com

 
U-16 Championship
2018 in youth association football
2018 in Malaysian football
2019 FIFA U-17 World Cup qualification
2018 AFC U-16 Championship
September 2018 sports events in Asia
October 2018 sports events in Asia